Libella is a soft drink that was widely consumed in Germany in the 1950s and 1960s. It was developed by Rudolf Wild, an entrepreneur from Heidelberg who sought to make a fruit-favored drink without artificial ingredients. The bottles were notable for their molded grooves and for their yellow-and-green logo printed directly on the bottle.

The Libella brand still exists, and also currently offers a cola product as well.

See also 

 Bluna
 Sinalco

Website 

 Libella's Website

Soft drinks